

Dinosaurs

Plesiosaurs

New taxa

Synapsids

Non-mammalian

References